The V. S. Popov Big Children's Choir of Russia Today Media is one of the most popular children's choirs from the former USSR and Russia. It is affiliated with the Rossiya Segodnya agency.

History
The choir was founded in 1970 and is based in Moscow. Its founding chief conductor was professor Victor Sergeevich Popov (1934–2008), People's Artist of the USSR. The choir, originally known as Big Children's Choir of the USSR All-Union National Radio Service and USSR Central Television Networks honoured its founder by assuming his name in 2008.

The choir has a very large repertoire made of thousands of different musical compositions, including short songs, cantatas, classical music, and Soviet and Russian patriotic songs and folk music. The choir had (and still has) the widest popularity in Soviet and post-Soviet society because of its repertoire for children including songs from children and teenage films, and even sang with well-known singers and starred in its own television programs and specials in the 1980s.

The choir's collection contains compositions written by composers such as Mikhail Glinka, Pyotr Tchaikovsky, Sergei Rachmaninoff, Sergei Prokofiev, Dmitri Shostakovich, Johann Sebastian Bach, Aleksandra Pakhmutova, Vladimir Shainsky, Eugeny Krylatov, Jury Chichkov etc.

Popular alumni of the BCC
Sergey Paramonov
Dmitry Golov
Oleg Kasyanov
Vitaliy Nikolaev
Tatyana Melekhina
Margarita Suhankina
Olga Korolkova
Dmitry Galikhin
Dmitry Mashnin
Konstantin Dyukin
Yuri Korobko
Sergey Kuzyurin
Alexey Proshkin
Alexey Stopkin
Konstantin Kirillov
Svetlana Kuleshova

External links
BBC Documentary "The Songs of Comrade Time"
"What became of the Soviet Union's child stars?" BBC World Service
Club of members and fans of Big Children's Choir
 Unofficial site
 Video channel

Russian music
Choirs of children
Musical groups established in 1970
1970 establishments in the Soviet Union